Highfield Rangers F.C. is an English football club based in the  Rushey Mead area of Leicester.

History
The club was established in 1970 by a group of immigrants from the West Indies. In 1988 they joined the Premier Division of the Central Midlands League. After four years of top-four finishes, the club joined the Leicestershire Senior League Premier Division in 1992. In 1998–99 they reached the third round of the FA Vase, which remains a club record. The following season they won the Premier Division.

Honours
Central Midlands League Premier Division
Runners-up 1989–90, 1990–91
Leicestershire Senior League Premier Division
Champions 1999–2000

Records
FA Vase
Third Round 1998–99

References

External links
Club website

Football clubs in England
Leicestershire Senior League
Football clubs in Leicestershire
Association football clubs established in 1970
1970 establishments in England
Sport in Leicester
Central Midlands Football League
Diaspora association football clubs in England